Methenmadinone, also known as deacetylsuperlutin or as 16-methylene-6-dehydro-17α-hydroxyprogesterone, is a pregnane steroid which was never marketed. It is a parent compound of methenmadinone acetate (the C17α acetate ester), melengestrol (the C6 methyl derivative), and chlormethenmadinone (the C6 chloro derivative).

References

Abandoned drugs
Tertiary alcohols
Diketones
Pregnanes
Progestogens
Vinylidene compounds